Badharghat is one of the 60 Legislative Assembly constituencies of Tripura state in India. It is part of West Tripura district and is reserved for candidates belonging to the Scheduled Castes. It is also part of West Tripura Lok Sabha constituency.

Members of Legislative Assembly

 1977: Jadab Majumdar, Communist Party of India (Marxist)
 1983: Jadab Majumdar, Communist Party of India (Marxist)
 1988: Dilip Sarkar, Indian National Congress
 1993: Jadab Majumdar, Communist Party of India (Marxist)
 1998: Dilip Sarkar, Indian National Congress
 2003: Subrata Chakrabarty, Communist Party of India (Marxist)
 2008: Dilip Sarkar, Indian National Congress
 2013: Dilip Sarkar, Indian National Congress

Election results

2018

2013

See also
List of constituencies of the Tripura Legislative Assembly
 West Tripura district
 Badharghat
 Tripura West (Lok Sabha constituency)

References

West Tripura district
Assembly constituencies of Tripura